Edgren is a Swedish surname. Notable people with the surname include:

August Hjalmar Edgren (1840–1903), Swedish-born American linguistics and university professor
John Alexis Edgren (1839–1908), Swedish-born American Baptist Minister 
Robert W. Edgren (1874–1939), American cartoonist, reporter and editor

See also
Anne Charlotte Edgren-Leffler (1849–1892), Swedish author

Swedish-language surnames